Velykokamianka is an urban-type settlement in Dovzhansk Raion of Luhansk Oblast of Ukraine. Population:

References

Urban-type settlements in Dovzhansk Raion